The Australian High Commissioner to Trinidad and Tobago is an officer of the Australian Department of Foreign Affairs and Trade and the head of the High Commission of the Commonwealth of Australia in the Republic of Trinidad and Tobago. The position has the rank and status of an Ambassador Extraordinary and Plenipotentiary and the high commissioner resides in Port of Spain. The high commissioner, since October 2019, is Bruce Lendon.

Posting history 
The Australian Government established a High Commission in Port of Spain in May 2004 and appointed its first resident High Commissioner, John Michell. Previously, responsibility for Australian diplomatic representation in Trinidad and Tobago was held in Canada (1974); Jamaica (1975–1994); and Barbados (1994–2004). The decision to move Australian Government representation from Barbados to Trinidad and Tobago was part of a review of Australia's diplomatic network completed in July 2003.

List of High Commissioners

References

External links
 Australian High Commission, Port of Spain

Trinidad and Tobago
 
 
 
Australia